Robert Marion La Follette Jr. (February 6, 1895 – February 24, 1953) was an American politician serving as a U.S. Senator from Wisconsin from 1925 to 1947. A member of the La Follette family, he was a son of U.S. Representative, U.S. Senator and Wisconsin Governor Robert M. La Follette Sr., and father of Wisconsin Attorney General Bronson La Follette. As co-founder of the Progressive Party and ally of the Farmer-Labor Party in adjacent Minnesota, La Follette kept the Progressive Party alive in the US Senate until his defeat by Joseph McCarthy in 1946.

Background
La Follette was born in Madison, Wisconsin, to Robert M. "Fighting Bob" La Follette Sr., and Belle Case La Follette. He had three siblings, including Philip La Follette and Fola La Follette.

La Follette attended the University of Wisconsin–Madison from 1913 to 1917 but he did not graduate because of a severe streptococcus infection.  He received the honorary degree of LL.D. from the University of Wisconsin in 1938. The same illness kept him out of the military during World War I.

Career
La Follette served as his father's private secretary between 1919 and 1925.

Republican
On September 29, 1925, La Follette was elected as a Republican to the United States Senate to fill the vacancy caused by the death of his father. "Young Bob", as he was called, was a champion of organized labor. He gained national prominence between 1936 and 1940 as chairman of a special Senate investigating committee, commonly called the La Follette Civil Liberties Committee, that exposed the surveillance, physical intimidation, and other techniques used by large employers to prevent workers from organizing.

He was chairman of the Committee on Manufactures in the 71st and 72nd Congresses. He supported President Franklin D. Roosevelt and most New Deal legislation until he broke over the passage of the 1938 naval expansion bill.

He was re-elected as a Republican in 1928, and as a Progressive in 1934 and 1940.

Progressive, Isolationist
With his brother Philip, he formed the Wisconsin Progressive Party in 1934, and for a time the party was dominant in Wisconsin. He was reelected with the Progressive Party in 1934 and 1940. One of the Senate's leading isolationists, La Follette helped found the America First Committee in 1940.

In April 1943 a confidential analysis by English researcher Isaiah Berlin for the British Foreign Office stated that La Follette was the: son of the celebrated Governor and brother of ex-Governor Philip La Follette of that State. Intimately tied with the very peculiar "progressive" Wisconsin political organization, who started as an Isolationist New Dealer and by degrees has turned into a confused anti-administration Nationalist. He is a very eccentric and unpredictable political figure who continues to be radical in internal issues and obscurantist in foreign affairs. He is said to be prepared to approve of Britain after she had expiated her past errors by more suffering than she had already endured. He is entirely independent of business interests and pressure groups, and his strength comes from the traditional place occupied by his family in Wisconsin. On the whole an ally of the Isolationists.

Republican
When the Wisconsin Progressive Party dissolved, La Follette returned to the Republican Party in 1946. He helped to draft and win passage of the Legislative Reorganization Act of 1946 that modernized the legislative process in Congress.

Defeat

La Follette was an unsuccessful candidate for reelection as a Republican in 1946. He ran an isolationist campaign against the United Nations and was critical of Soviet dictator Joseph Stalin; he ended up narrowly losing to Joseph McCarthy in the Republican primary, by 207,935 votes to 202,557. While La Follette initially started with a large lead in the polls, that lead gradually dwindled, and on the primary election day, the results of the final county to report polls tipped the scales in McCarthy's favor. La Follette sent a one-word telegram saying "Congratulations" to McCarthy.

La Follette made several decisions that hurt his primary campaign. Disbanding the Progressive Party and seeking election on the Republican ticket that same year cost him the support of many progressive supporters that belonged to the former, while the more conservative Republicans were also suspicious of La Follette, for he had previously run against them. Being initially confident of victory, he further hurt his chances by staying on in Washington to draft and win passage of the Legislative Reorganization Act of 1946 rather than returning to Wisconsin to campaign for re-election.

La Follette faced an aggressive campaign by McCarthy and failed to refute the latter's charges, several of which were false. McCarthy attacked La Follette for not enlisting during the war, although La Follette had been 46 when Pearl Harbor was bombed and would have been too old to be accepted. McCarthy played up his own wartime service, using his wartime nickname "Tail-Gunner Joe", and the slogan "Congress needs a tail-gunner". McCarthy also claimed that while he had been away fighting for his country, La Follette had made huge profits from investments; the suggestion that La Follette had been guilty of war profiteering was deeply damaging. (In fact, McCarthy had invested in the stock market himself during the war, netting a profit of $42,000 in 1943. La Follette's investments consisted of partial interest in a radio station, which earned him a profit of $47,000 over two years.)

Arnold Beichman later stated that McCarthy "was elected to his first term in the Senate with support from the Communist-controlled United Electrical, Radio and Machine Workers, CIO", which preferred McCarthy to the anti-communist Robert M. La Follette. This allegation, however, has never been proved.

After his defeat by McCarthy, La Follette was a foreign aid advisor to the Truman administration.

In a Collier's Weekly article of February 8, 1947, La Follette reported infiltration of Communists onto Congressional committee staffs. He wrote, "I know from firsthand experience that Communist sympathizers have infiltrated into committee staffs on Capitol Hill in Washington." He cited his own former subcommittee, as well as the Kilgore Subcommittee on War Mobilization and the Murray Social Committee on Small Business. He named some half-dozen CIO affiliates as being openly pro-Communist: United Electrical, Radio and Machine Workers (UE), International Fur & Leather Workers Union (IFLWU), United Public Workers of America (UPWA), Transport Workers Union, Mine, Mill and Smelter Workers (MMSW), the Farm Equipment and Metal Workers, the United Furniture Workers of America (UFW), and the American Communications Association. He also stated that the difficult people to deal with were not "avowed Communists" but "fellow travelers" because "There is no litmus-paper test for these people." The only people he named were union leaders: Abram Flaxer of the UPWA, Reid Robinson of the MMSW, Ben Gold of the Furriers, Michael Quill of the TWU, and Joseph Ryan of the IL.

In August 1947, Washington-based columnist Marquis Childs reported that La Follette was "comfortably established in his own offices in Washington as an economic consultant to several large corporations."

Personal life and death
In 1930, La Follette married Rachel Wilson Young. They had two children, Joseph Oden La Follette and Bronson Cutting La Follette.

On February 24, 1953, La Follette was found dead of a self-inflicted gunshot wound just days after his 58th birthday in Washington, D.C.

La Follette was interred at Forest Hill Cemetery in Madison, Wisconsin, and was survived by his sons, Bronson La Follette, who served as Wisconsin's attorney general from 1965 to 1969 and from 1975 to 1987, and Joseph Oden La Follette, who spent his career working at IBM.

On September 9, 1953, John Lautner testified before McCarthy's Permanent Subcommittee on Investigations, revealing the existence of the Communists who had served on La Follette's subcommittee staff. Some historians believe that La Follette killed himself out of fear of being exposed by McCarthy; others believe he succumbed to anxiety and depression that had plagued him for much of his life.

Awards
 1938: Honorary LL.D. from the University of Wisconsin
 1947: Collier's magazine Congressional Award for outstanding public service

Works
 "Never Prohibition Again", Atlantic Monthly (1943) 
 "A Senator Looks at Congress", Atlantic Monthly (1943) 
 "Turn the Light on Communism", Collier's Weekly (1947)

See also
 List of American politicians who switched parties in office
 List of United States senators who switched parties

References

Further reading
 Glad, Paul W. The History of Wisconsin, vol. V: War, a New Era, and Depression 1914–1940 (1990) passim.

External links

 
 Robert M. La Follette, Jr., Dictionary of Wisconsin History, Wisconsin State Historical Society
 "La Follette suicide linked to fear of McCarthy" May 17, 2003 Milwaukee Journal-Sentinel
 Matusow, Harvey "The FBI, and the Justice Department: Becoming a Government Informer-witness in the McCarthy Era"
 La Follette at the Dictionary of Wisconsin History 
 Maney, Patrick, "Joe McCarthy's First Victim", Virginia Quarterly Review, Summer 2001
 Youngs, William, American Realities, Sixth Edition Volume 2, Eastern Washington University, 2006.

1895 births
1953 suicides
20th-century American politicians
American politicians who committed suicide
Burials in Wisconsin
La Follette family
Politicians from Madison, Wisconsin
Republican Party United States senators from Wisconsin
Suicides by firearm in Washington, D.C.
University of Wisconsin–Madison alumni
Wisconsin Progressives (1924)
Wisconsin Republicans
Progressivism in the United States